John Charles Morgan (born 9 August 1955) is an English musician, singer and songwriter.

Early years
Charlie Morgan was born in Hammersmith, London. He became professional in 1973

Music career
By the mid-1980s, Charlie Morgan had become one of the top session drummers in the UK. In the 1980s he played on albums by artists including Elton John, Gary Moore, Justin Hayward, Kate Bush, Roy Harper, Pete Townshend, Judie Tzuke, Clannad, Tracey Ullman and Nik Kershaw. He was also the drummer in Gary Moore & Phil Lynott's video "Out in the Fields".

In 1985 his drumming work with Nik Kershaw attracted the attention of Elton John, who booked him to play on his Ice on Fire album. Later that year John invited him to play with his band at Live Aid. This was the start of a thirteen-year period of recording and touring with John.

Morgan co-wrote the theme music to the ITV TV series, The Bill, with bassist Andy Pask.

Discography

Studio albums 
 Lionheart (1978) - Kate Bush
 Shoot the Moon (1982) - Judie Tzuke
 Work of Heart (1982) - Roy Harper
 Human Racing (1984) - Nik Kershaw
 The Riddle (1984) - Nik Kershaw
 Hounds of Love (1985) – Kate Bush
 Ice on Fire (1985) – Elton John
 Music from the Edge of Heaven (1986) - Wham!
 Leather Jackets (1986) – Elton John
 Reg Strikes Back (1988) – Elton John
 The Sensual World (1989) – Kate Bush
 Oltre (1990) - Claudio Baglioni
 In ogni senso (1991) - Eros Ramazzotti
 Left Hand Talking (1991) - Judie Tzuke
 Ya Viene el Sol (1992) - Mecano
 The Red Shoes (1992) - Kate Bush
 Great Expectations (1993) - Tasmin Archer
 Sensual World (1995) - Kate Bush
 Made in England (1995) – Elton John
 The Big Picture (1997) – Elton John
 Flowers in the Dirt (1997) - Paul McCartney
 I Hear Talk (2004) - Bucks Fizz
 Franco American Swing (2004) - John Jorgenson
 Lost and Found (2004) - David Byron Band
 Beneath the Olympian Skies (2006) - Jim Wilson
 4th Estate (2006) - James Litherland
 e2 (2007) - Eros Ramazzotti
 The Greatest Songs of the Eighties (2008) - Barry Manilow
 Inusual (2010) - Yuri
 Run from the Wildfire (2010) - Rococo
 Ghosts of the Good (2011) - Waterfront
 Dangerous Music II (2015) - Robin George
 Painful Kiss (2016) - Robin George
 Frankie Miller's Double Take (2016) - Various Artists

Live albums 
 Live in Australia with the Melbourne Symphony Orchestra (1986) – Elton John

Compilation albums 
 Elton John's Greatest Hits Vol. 3 (1987) – Elton John
 To Be Continued... (1990) – Elton John
 The Very Best of Elton John (1990) – Elton John
 Greatest Hits 1976–1986 (1992) – Elton John
 Love Songs (1995) – Elton John
 Greatest Hits 1970–2002 (2002) – Elton John
 The Greatest Songs of the Eighties (2008) – Barry Manilow

Soundtracks 
 Mad Max Beyond Thunderdome (1985) – Maurice Jarre
 Thelma & Louise (1991) – Hans Zimmer
 Kiss of Death (1995) – Trevor Jones
 Tomorrow Never Dies (1997) – David Arnold
 G.I. Jane (1997) – Trevor Jones
 Dancer in the Dark (1999) – Bjork
 Quantum of Solace (2008) – David Arnold

Video 
 Elton John: Live in Barcelona (1992) – Elton John
 Orleans: Official History & Music (2009) – Orleans

TV appearances 
 Elton John in Australia (1987) – Elton John
 An Audience with Elton John (1997) – Elton John

Live performances

 Elton John (13 July 1985)

Concert tours
 Ice on Fire Tour – Elton John (1985–1986)
 Tour De Force – Elton John (1986)
 Sleeping with the Past Tour – Elton John (1989-1990) 
 The One Tour – Elton John (1992–1993)
 Face to Face 1994 - Elton John & Billy Joel (1994)
 Face to Face 1995 – Elton John & Billy Joel (1995)
 Made in England Tour – Elton John (1995) 
 The Big Picture Tour – Elton John (1997)

Miscellaneous performances
 Live Aid London, Wembley Stadium – Elton John, Wham! (13 July 1985)

Personal life
He currently lives in Nashville, Tennessee, USA.

See also
 List of drummers

References

External links
 Charlie Morgan web site

1955 births
Living people
English rock drummers
British male drummers
English songwriters
The Gary Moore Band members
People from Hammersmith
English session musicians
British expatriates in the United States
The Bill
English television composers
English film score composers
English male film score composers
Tom Robinson Band members
Elton John Band members
Orleans (band) members